Located directly east of the Korle Lagoon, Jamestown and Usshertown are the oldest districts of Accra, Ghana and emerged as communities around the 17th century British James Fort and Dutch Ussher Fort on the Gulf of Guinea coast. These districts were developed at the end of the 19th century, and following the rapid growth of the city during the 20th century, they became areas of a dense mixture of commercial and residential use.

History

Today, both Jamestown and Usshertown remain fishing communities inhabited primarily by the Ga. Although in a state of decay, the districts are significant in the history of Accra, which replaced Cape Coast as the capital of Gold Coast (British colony) in 1876.

Since World War II, a succession of plans to enhance the capital city have come with changes in government, some seeing improvements in Jamestown as a necessary part of the overall plan, and some treating such improvements as competing with the efforts to develop the central business district of Accra farther north.  Currently, plans are afoot to re-develop the districts of Jamestown and Usshertown, referred to as "Ga-Mashie" with the inauguration of the 2015 Old Accra Strategy. The popular Azonto dance originated from Jamestown. The local language "Ga" is often spoken by the natives.

Areas of Jamestown and Usshertown include Bukom, known for its boxing gyms, Adedainkpo, former home of the wealthiest African residents of Accra, Swalaba, Korle Woko (formerly also known as Ripponville), and Akoto Lante.

Jamestown hosts the annual Chale Wote Street Art Festival.

Chieftaincy
The current traditional chief is Oblempong Nii Wetse Kojo II. He was inducted after the passing of the previous chief Oblempong Nii Kojo Ababio V who had been chief for thirty-nine years. His death was officially announced in February 2018 and the new chief Oblempong Nii Wetse Kojo II was inducted on 1 February 2018.

Landmarks/Places of Interest
James Fort
Jamestown Lighthouse
Ussher Fort
Accra Central Station
Accra Central Post Office
Rawlings Park
Makola Market #2
High Street
Construction of the Jamestown Fishing Harbor, Ghana

References

Accra